Tamás Horváth (born 23 October 1951) is a Hungarian chess International Master (1982). He is a European Team Chess Championship bronze medalist (1983).

Biography 
In the 1980s Tamás Horváth was one of the top Hungarian chess players. He competed many times in the finals of the individual Hungarian Chess Championships and twice in 1980 and 1982 won silver medals.

Tamás Horváth played for Hungary in the European Team Chess Championship:
 In 1983, at second reserve board in the 8th European Team Chess Championship in Plovdiv (+3, =1, -1), and won team bronze and individual silver medals.

Tamás Horváth played for Hungary in the World Student Team Chess Championship:
 In 1974, at second reserve board in the 20th World Student Team Chess Championship in Teesside (+5, =1, -1) and won team bronze medal.

Tamás Horváth played for Hungary in the Men's Chess Mitropa Cup:
 In 1991, at reserve board in the 14th Chess Mitropa Cup in Brno (+1, =1, -0).

Tamás Horváth played for chess club Zalaegerszegi Csuti Antal SK in the European Chess Club Cup 11 times (1993-1996, 1999, 2001–2002, 2004–2007).

In 1982, Tamás Horváth was awarded the FIDE International Master (IM) title.

References

External links

1951 births
Living people
People from Zalaegerszeg
Chess International Masters
Hungarian chess players